Acanthodoris armata is a species of sea slug, a dorid nudibranch, a shell-less marine gastropod mollusc in the family Onchidorididae.

This is a taxon inquirendum.

Distribution 
This species was described from specimens found in the intertidal region at False Narrows, Nanaimo, Vancouver Island, Canada feeding on the bryozoan Dendrobeania lichenoides (Robertson, 1900).

References

Onchidorididae
Gastropods described in 1927